Taiamã Ecological Station is an ecological station in the Mato Grosso state of Brazil.

Creation

In the 1970s the Special Secretariat of the Environment under the environmentalist Paulo Nogueira Neto launched a program of estações ecológicas (ecological stations) with the aim of establishing a network of reserves that would protect representative samples of all Brazilian ecosystems.
Several stations were created in 1981, of which the Taiamã Ecological Station was the only one in the Pantanal, created by decree on 2 June 1981.

The Taiamã Ecological Station is in the Cáceres and Poconé municipalities of Mato Grosso.
The purpose is to preserve nature and support scientific research.

Environment

The station consists mostly of flooded fields, but includes permanent and temporary lakes, ponds and meandering streams, strongly influenced by seasonal fluctuations of the Paraguay River.

The vegetation of the Pantanal is mainly influenced by the Cerrado biome, but also has elements from the Amazon rainforest, Gran Chaco and Atlantic Forest.
There are large fields of grass interspersed with areas of forest, and riparian forest along the rivers around the station.
Water plants such as water hyacinth (eichhornia crassipes) provide shelter for fish to lay their eggs.
Islands of water hyacinth floating down river during floods transport many animal and plant species.
The region is notable for its extraordinary concentration and abundance of wildlife.
Migratory birds include vermilion flycatcher (pyrocephalus rubinus), American cliff swallow (hirundo pyrrhonota),  barn swallow (hirundo rustica) and purple martin (progne subis).

Status

Endangered species in the ecological station include the jaguar (Panthera onca), giant otter (Pteronura brasiliensis) and marsh deer (Blastocerus dichotomus). Since 2018 the station has been designated as a protected Ramsar site.

References

Sources

Ecological stations of Brazil
Pantanal
Protected areas of Mato Grosso
1981 establishments in Brazil
Protected areas established in 1981
Ramsar sites in Brazil